Hamden is a town in New Haven County, Connecticut, United States. The town's nickname is "The Land of the Sleeping Giant".  The population was 61,169 at the 2020 census.

History

The peaceful tribe of Quinnipiacs were the first residents of the land that is now Hamden, they had great regard awe and veneration for the Blue Hills Sleeping Giant Mountain. [1]Hamden was purchased by William Christopher Reilly and the Reverend John Davenport in 1638 from the local Quinnipiac Native American tribe. It was settled by Puritans as part of the town of New Haven.  It remained a part of New Haven until 1786 when 1,400 local residents incorporated the area as a separate town, naming it after the English statesman John Hampden.

Largely developed as a nodal collection of village-like settlements (which remain distinct today), including Mount Carmel (home to Quinnipiac University), Whitneyville, Spring Glen, West Woods, and Highwood, Hamden has a long-standing industrial history. In 1798, four years after Eli Whitney began manufacturing the cotton gin in New Haven, he made arms for the U.S. government at a mill site in Hamden, where a waterfall provided a good source of power. At that site, Whitney introduced the modern era of mass production with the concept of interchangeable parts.

The major thoroughfare through Hamden is named Whitney Avenue in honor of Eli Whitney, and it runs past Whitney's old factory, now the Eli Whitney Museum.

Whitney constructed stone houses for his employees in the nearby area, which is still referred to as Whitneyville; this is believed to be the first example of employer-provided homes in U.S. history. In 1806, the dam that Eli Whitney built at the mill site was enlarged to create a reservoir, Lake Whitney. The first truss bridge in the United States was erected nearby over the Mill River in Whitneyville in 1823, but has since been replaced.

The Farmington Canal, which ships traveled from New Haven northward, passed through Hamden between 1825 and 1848 until it was supplanted by railroad travel. The canal right-of-way has become, in recent years, a popular walking and bicycling trail, passing by some of the well-preserved locks of the canal, as well as some of Hamden's oldest sites. Before its use as a walking and bicycling trail, many local residents rode their motocross bikes on the Farmington Canal.

During the 19th and early 20th centuries, Hamden received a steady influx of immigrants, most notably from Italy and Ireland. To this day, a large part of Greater New Haven's Italian-American community resides in Hamden.

During the post-war period, Hamden underwent significant suburban development. Much of the southern section of town is urbanized and is difficult to distinguish from neighboring New Haven. The northern section of town, however, retains a more rural character, and has the distinct neighborhood of Mount Carmel. This area of town is the location of the unique Sleeping Giant hill formation that is the source of the town's nickname.

Geography

The town features the Mill River, which runs from the northern part of town, is dammed to form Lake Whitney, and flows from there to Long Island Sound. The town also has the Quinnipiac River and Lake Wintergreen, as well as numerous small streams.

Neighborhoods
 Augerville
 Beecher Heights
 Centerville (Town Center)
 Dunbar Hill
 Hamden Plains
 Highwood
 Mix District
Mount Carmel
 Pine Rock
 Spring Glen
 State Street (East Side)
 West Woods
Whitneyville

Notable areas 

The Town Hall at the center of Hamden has a distinctive appearance. The rotunda includes commemorative stained glass windows. Across the street is Freedom Park, which contains a fountain with concrete stepping stones leading to a sign that pleads for peace in several different languages. The Town recently completed new facilities for the police and fire departments in the newly renovated Town Hall.

Hamden was host to the Ghost Parking Lot, a notable roadside public art installation located in front of the Hamden Plaza shopping center in Hamden's commercial district on Dixwell Avenue. Erected in 1978, it consisted of 15 car hulks, specially treated and encased in asphalt. Although featured in over 100 art books, the attraction was torn down in 2003 due to the excessive cost of restoration and repair.

Adjacent municipalities 
Hamden is bordered by six other towns:
 To its north, Cheshire and Wallingford
 To its east, North Haven
 To its south, New Haven
 To its west, Woodbridge and Bethany

Government

Hamden is governed by a mayor-council form of government, with a 15-member legislative council. Six councilors are elected at large while the other nine are elected by district. Town elections are held biennially during odd years in November. Other elected positions in the town government are the Town Clerk and members of the Board of Education. Positions in the various town boards and commissions are generally appointed by the Mayor subject to approval by the Legislative Council.

Lauren Garrett became the town's 14th mayor in November 2021. Past mayors of Hamden are:
Curt Balzano Leng, 2015–2021
Scott Jackson, 2009–2015
Craig Henrici, 2005–2009
Carl Amento, 1999–2005
Barbara DeNicola, 1997–1999
Lillian Clayman, 1991–1997
Johnny Carusone, 1987–1991
John DeNicola Jr., 1985–1987
Peter Villano, 1981–1985
Dick Harris, 1979–1981
Lucien DiMeo, 1973–1979
Bill Adams, 1967–1973
John DeNicola Sr., 1965–1967

John DeNicola Sr. was the town's last first selectman before becoming the town’s first mayor, in November 1965.

Economy
The main industries in the town are retail trade, computer products, manufacture of wire and cable, concrete, pump mixer products, fabricated metals, construction and business services. Business services account for 49.4% of employment in the town, with retail trade accounting for 22.8%, and manufacturing accounting for 9.6%. The top four major employers are the Town government and school district, Quinnipiac University, Harborside Health Care, and Area Cooperative Education Services (ACES).

Shaw's Supermarket was one of the top five major employers, but the Hamden Shaw's was sold to ShopRite in a sale of Shaw's Connecticut stores announced on February 13, 2010.  The Shaw's supermarket has been shut down and the new ShopRite store has opened.

Hamden is a residential suburb for New Haven, with more residents commuting to work in New Haven than residents working in Hamden.

Transportation
The Wilbur Cross Parkway runs through the center of the town serving as a connection to Hartford to the north and the New York metropolitan area to the south. The town is connected to Interstate 91 via Connecticut Route 40, a spur expressway to the Mount Carmel section of town. The main route from the town center to New Haven passing through the commercial areas of Hamden is Dixwell Avenue (Route 10). Another route to New Haven via the Spring Glen and Whitneyville residential neighborhoods is Whitney Avenue.

Public transportation is provided by Connecticut Transit New Haven. The main bus routes in the town are the Dixwell Avenue (238, formerly D) and the Whitney Avenue (228/229, formerly J) routes. Other secondary routes serving the town are the State Street (224, formerly M), Winchester Avenue (234, formerly O), and Shelton Avenue (237, formerly G) bus routes.

North Haven Station, a station on the Hartford Line commuter railroad, is planned be built next to the Hamden–North Haven border near the Route 40 Connector, serving both towns.

Tweed New Haven Airport (HVN) in East Haven and Bradley International Airport (BDL) in Windsor Locks are the closest commercial airports to Hamden.

Education

Public

The public school district for the town, Hamden Public Schools, operates eight elementary schools, a middle school, and a high school, enrolling a total of about 5,398 students.

Elementary schools

Alice Peck Early Learning Center (Pre-K, with an enrollment of about 153 students), located on Hillfield Road
Bear Path Elementary School (K–6, with an enrollment of about 446 students), located on Kirk Road
Church Street Elementary School (K–6, with an enrollment of about 320 students), located on Church Street
Dunbar Hill Elementary School (K–6, with an enrollment of about 279 students), located on Lane Street
Helen Street Elementary School (K–6, with an enrollment of about 334 students), located on Helen Street
Ridge Hill Elementary School (K–6, with an enrollment of about 343 students), located on Carew Road
Shepherd Glen Elementary School (K–6, with an enrollment of about 308 students), located on Skiff Street Extension, established in 1972 
Spring Glen Elementary School (K–6, with an enrollment of about 440 students), located on Whitney Avenue
West Woods Elementary School (K–6, with an enrollment of about 350 students), located on West Todd Street

Middle school

Hamden Middle School (grades 7 and 8, with an enrollment of about 890 students)

High school

Hamden High School (grades 9–12, with an enrollment of about 1,486 students)

Magnet schools

In addition to the town's public schools, Hamden is the site of two magnet schools, Wintergreen Magnet School (Kindergarten through grade 8) and Highville Mustard Seed Charter School (high school).

Technical high school

Eli Whitney Technical High School is located in Hamden.

Private

Hamden is home to several private and religious schools, including:
 Hamden Hall Country Day School (grades Pre-K to 12th)
 Laurel Oaks Adventist School (grades Pre-K to 8th)
 Lorraine D. Foster Day School
 Sacred Heart Academy (grades 9–12)
 SKF Academy
 St. Rita School (Roman Catholic, grades Pre-K to 8)
 St. Stephen  School (Roman Catholic, grades Pre-K to 8, closed in 2017)
 West Woods Christian Academy (evangelical Christian, grades K–12)

Colleges and universities

 Quinnipiac University, which has an enrollment of about 9,000 students, has its Mount Carmel and York Hill campuses in Hamden, with a third campus in North Haven.
 Mount Sacred Heart College, a Catholic women's college associated with Sacred Heart Academy, closed in 1997.
 Paier College of Art, formerly in Hamden, moved to Bridgeport and changed its name to Paier College in 2021.
Small portions of the campuses of Southern Connecticut State University and Albertus Magnus College in New Haven extend just over the city line into southernmost Hamden, as do a few outlying buildings of Yale University.

19th-century schools

 The Rectory school, a boys boarding school, was established in 1843 by Reverend Charles W. Everest, the rector of the Grace Church.  It was located in Centerville and at its height had 65 students. It closed in 1895.

Quality of life
Within the town limits, there are 16 banks, six lodging facilities, and 29 day care facilities. There are no hospitals in the town, although it is close to the major hospitals in New Haven. In 2004, the crime rate was 2,084 per 100,000 residents, lower than the statewide average of 2,981 per 100,000 residents. The town library has 166,358 volumes (as of 2001).

Electricity in the town is provided by the United Illuminating company; natural gas is provided by the Southern Connecticut Gas company; the water provider is the South Central Connecticut Regional Water Authority; Cable TV is provided by Comcast of New Haven.

There are several parks and museums located in Hamden. Hamden Town Center Park hosts fireworks, free concerts, outdoor movies, and other seasonal festivals. Other parks include the Eli Whitney Museum in Whitneyville, Ireland’s Great Hunger Museum, parts of West Rock Ridge State Park (including Lake Wintergreen) and East Rock Park (including the Pardee Rose Garden), Brooksvale Park and the adjoining Mount Sanford block of Naugatuck State Forest, and the Sleeping Giant State Park. The Farmington Canal Trail runs through the town. Two blue-blazed hiking trails, the Quinnipiac Trail and the Regicides Trail, also run through the town.

The Jonathan Dickerman House, listed on the National Register of Historic Places, is located in Mount Carmel. Hamden also has an all-volunteer orchestra, the Hamden Symphony Orchestra, providing concerts throughout the year.

Demographics

As of the census of 2010, there were 60,690 people, 23,727 households, and 14,300 families residing in the town. The racial makeup of the town was 68.45% White, 20.19% African American, 0.15% Native American, 5.47% Asian, 0.03% Pacific Islander, 3.00% from other races, and 2.72% from two or more races. Hispanic or Latino of any race were 8.74% of the population.

There were 23,727 households, out of which 25.3% had children under the age of 18 living with them, 44.4% were married couples living together, 12.5% had a female householder with no husband present, and 39.7% were non-families. 31.2% of all households were made up of individuals, and 12.7% had someone living alone who was 65 years of age or older.  The average household size was 2.37 and the average family size was 3.01.

In the town, the population was spread out, with 24.4% under the age of 20, 10.6% from 20 to 24, 24.6% from 25 to 44, 25.4% from 45 to 64, and 15.0% who were 65 years of age or older.  The median age was 37.4 years. For every 100 females, there were 82.6 males.  For every 100 females age 18 and over, there were 80.7 males.

The median income for a household in the town was $66,695, and the median income for a family was $88,613. The per capita income for the town was $34,596.  About 3.8% of families and 6.8% of the population were below the poverty line, including 6.3% of those under age 18 and 5.4% of those age 65 or over.

Notable people 

 Sidney Altman, Nobel Laureate, resident since 1972
 Afa Anoa'i Jr., former WWE professional wrestler known as Manu
 Jennifer Barnhart, puppeteer, born and grew up in town
 Glenn Beck, conservative television personality, lived in Hamden from 1992 to 2000 where he co-hosted The Glenn and Pat Show, a morning radio program on KC101
 Ernest Borgnine (1917–2012), actor, was born in town in 1917
 Scott Burrell, two-sport athlete and longtime professional basketball player, grew up in town
 Bruce Campbell, former NFL tackle, born in town
 John Carpenter, the first winner of Who Wants to Be a Millionaire
 Joe Castiglione, former TV play-by-play man for the Cleveland Indians, now for the Boston Red Sox
 Willis H. Downs, Medal of Honor recipient
 Paul Fusco, the voice, creator, and puppeteer of ALF, grew up in town
 James J. Greco, former CEO and President of Sbarro, grew up in town
 Linda Greenhouse (born 1947), Pulitzer Prize-winning journalist, grew up in town
 Henry Gruber (1863–1932), baseball player, holds record for most walks allowed in a game at 16
 Donald Hall, poet, named poet laureate of the United States in 2006, grew up in town
 Jean Harris, killer and ex-lover of Dr. Herman Tarnower, the co-author of The Complete Scarsdale Medical Diet
 Anttaj Hawthorne, former Oakland Raiders defensive tackle, grew up in town
 Bob Heussler, voice of the Connecticut Sun and a WFAN broadcaster, has resided in Hamden since 1983
 Jen Hudak, professional freeskier
 Jake Hurwitz, comedian, writer and actor, member of the comedy duo Jake and Amir
 Dwayne "The Rock" Johnson, professional wrestler and actor, is an alumnus of Shepherd Glen Elementary School and Hamden Middle School
 Stephen Malawista, medical researcher, co-discoverer of Lyme disease
 Ingram Marshall, American composer
 Robert McVey, hockey player, Gold Medalist at 1960 Olympics
 Steven Novella, podcast host of The Skeptics' Guide to the Universe
 Jaroslav Pelikan (1923–2006), leading scholar in the history of Christianity and medieval intellectual history, resided and died in town
 Jonathan Quick, goaltender for the NHL's Los Angeles Kings
 Anthony Rossomando, of Dirty Pretty Things
 Benjamin Scolnic, author, rabbi, long-time resident
 Dana Terrace, writer, director, storyboard artist, and animator known for creating the Disney Channel animated series, The Owl House
 Alan Trachtenberg, Yale faculty and Yale administrator
 Phil Weinberg, Deputy Chancellor for Teaching and Learning, New York City Department of Education
 Eli Whitney (1765–1825), inventor of the cotton gin 
 Thornton Wilder (1897–1975), the playwright, lived in town and is buried in Mount Carmel Cemetery
 Avery Wilson, R&B singer, contestant on The Voice, born and raised in Hamden
 Eddie Wilson (1909–1979), outfielder, born in Hamden
 C. Vann Woodward (1908–1999), preeminent historian focusing on the South and race relations, was a resident of the town at the time of his death

See also
 Door Tree
 1989 Northeastern United States tornado outbreak
 February 2013 nor'easter

References

External links

 Town of Hamden official website
 Hamden Chamber of Commerce
 History of the town of Hamden, Connecticut, an 1888 book digitized by Quinnipiac University

 
Towns in Connecticut
Towns in New Haven County, Connecticut
Towns in the New York metropolitan area